Bellamy's Backyard Safari is a BBC nature documentary series presented by David Bellamy that was first transmitted in the United Kingdom on BBC One in July 1981. It featured the use of special effects to shrink Bellamy down to a size smaller than an insect and followed his adventures on a safari through a typical British garden. 

Directed by Paul Kriwaczek and produced by Mike Weatherley, the four-part series from the BBC Natural History Unit included specialist natural history filming by London Scientific Films. Scenes include Bellamy on a spider web, encountering slugs and millipedes and watching the germination of seeds. A book with the same title was published in 1981 to accompany the series.

Episodes

References

External links
 

1981 British television series debuts
1981 British television series endings
1980s British documentary television series
BBC television documentaries
1980s British television miniseries
English-language television shows